Giglioli is an Italian surname. Notable persons with the name include:

Enrico Hillyer Giglioli (1845–1909), Italian zoologist and anthropologist
Giulio Giglioli (1886–1957), Italian art historian 
George Giglioli (1897-1975), Anglo-Italian physician who worked as malariologist in Guyana

Italian-language surnames